Notre Dame is a census-designated place and unincorporated community north of the city of South Bend in St. Joseph County, in the U.S. state of Indiana. It includes the campuses of three colleges: the University of Notre Dame, Saint Mary's College, and Holy Cross College. Notre Dame is split between Clay and Portage Townships. As of the 2020 census, its population was 7,234.

Demographics

Holy Cross religious communities
Holy Cross Village at Notre Dame is a retirement community offering continuing care. It is owned by the Brothers of Holy Cross and managed by the Franciscan Sisters of Chicago Service Corporation.

Notre Dame is the home of three major headquarters of Holy Cross religious communities. On the campus of Saint Mary's College the Sisters of the Holy Cross have their Congregational Administration. The Holy Cross College campus is the location of the Provincial Offices of two provinces of the Congregation of Holy Cross: the Midwest Province of Brothers and the Indiana Province of Priests and Brothers. In addition to these, Notre Dame also holds provinces of the Superior Faith, which are the Eastern Province of Sisters and the Notre Dame Province of Holy Cross.

Government and infrastructure
As unincorporated communities do not have a municipal government, Notre Dame's government entities are the United States post office and the colleges' police forces. All colleges and universities in Indiana are entitled to an independent police force by law. The University of Notre Dame also has its own fire department and supplies its own water and power utilities, except University Village and Cripe Street Apartments, Notre Dame's family and married housing get their electricity from American Electric Power.

A post office has been in operation in Notre Dame since 1851. The United States Postal Service Notre Dame Post Office is located in the northwest corner of Hammes Mowbray Hall, west of East Gate along Juniper Road on the University of Notre Dame campus.

Education
Notre Dame is in the South Bend Community School Corporation (SBCSC). The school zonings are as follows: Darden Elementary School Edison Middle School and Clay High School (for Landings at Notre Dame). Previously Darden Primary, Tarkington Traditional Elementary, Clay Intermediate, and Clay High served as the local public schools for children of graduate students at University Village. At the end of the 2017-2018 school year Fischer Graduate Residence became the designated housing for students with dependent children, as University Village closed.

References

 
Census-designated places in Indiana
Census-designated places in St. Joseph County, Indiana
South Bend – Mishawaka metropolitan area
University of Notre Dame